Keystone College is a private college in Northeastern Pennsylvania. Although the college's official mailing address is La Plume, Pennsylvania in Lackawanna County, much of the campus is in Factoryville in Wyoming County. It was founded in 1868 and enrolls approximately 1,300 students in around 40 undergraduate and graduate degree programs.

History
Keystone Academy was founded in 1868 by John Howard Harris. The academy was originally chartered by the Commonwealth of Pennsylvania in 1868, with instruction beginning the following year in the local Baptist church in Factoryville. At the time it was chartered, Keystone Academy was the only high school between Binghamton, New York and Scranton, Pennsylvania. Louis Arthur Watres was a longtime trustee of Keystone Military Academy, and was one of the leaders who transformed the school into Scranton-Keystone Junior College in 1934. Laurence Hawley Watres succeeded his father as a trustee, and remained on the board until 1962, when he was designated a trustee emeritus. In 1944, the name was shortened to Keystone Junior College. The current name Keystone College was adopted in 1995.

In 1998, the school received formal approval from the Pennsylvania Department of Education to offer baccalaureate degree programs. A monumental step in Keystone's history and a signal of the college's continued progress, Keystone received approval to offer master's degrees in  2014.

Since its founding in 1868, the school has had several bands and orchestras. New musical opportunities were made available to the campus and surrounding communities in 2014, through the newly formed Department of Performance Music. In a return to its athletic roots, Keystone reintroduced wrestling in 2016 and announced plans in 2018 to field a football team in 2019.

Campus

Keystone's scenic 276-acre (1.1 km2) campus, located at the gateway to the Endless Mountains of Northeastern Pennsylvania, features hiking trails and a freshwater stream. The campus is 15 miles northwest of Scranton on U.S. Routes 6 and 11, and is located in both Lackawanna and Wyoming counties.

Woodlands Campus
Keystone's 170-acre Woodlands Campus features approximately seven miles of hiking trails that are open to students and the public seven days a week from dawn until dusk.

Academics 
Keystone College offers more than 50 degree options at the undergraduate and graduate levels in several academic programs within two schools. The college is accredited by the Middle States Commission on Higher Education.

Turock School of Arts and Sciences
 Communication, Art, and Humanities
 Biological and Physical Sciences and Mathematics
 Social and Behavioral Sciences

School of Professional Studies
 Business, Management, and Technology
 Education

Athletics 
Keystone's 16 teams compete in the Colonial States Athletic Conference as a Division III school under the NCAA. Teams are known as the Giants in honor of the baseball team that alumnus Christy Mathewson played for.

Men's teams
 Baseball
 Basketball
 Cross Country
 Football 
 Lacrosse
 Soccer
 Track and Field
 Wrestling

Women's teams
 Basketball
 Cross Country
 Field Hockey
 Lacrosse
 Soccer
 Softball
 Track and Field
 Volleyball

Publications
The Key is the student newspaper.
The Keystonian is the college magazine for alumni and friends.

Notable alumni
 Thomas LoBasso (class of 1985), Daytona State College president
 Sandra Major (class of 1974), former Pennsylvania State Representative
 Christy Mathewson (class of 1898), former professional baseball player and inaugural member of the Baseball Hall of Fame (1936)
 Kate Micucci (class of 2001), actress and musician
 Shay Neary (class of 2012), fashion model
 Thomas See (class of 1991), Live Nation Entertainment executive
 Suzanne Fisher Staples (class of 1965), author and journalist
 Art Wall Jr. (class of 1944), former professional golfer and former Masters champion
 Red Wallace, former basketball player and coach

References

External links
 
 Keystone College official athletics website

 
Educational institutions established in 1868
Universities and colleges in Lackawanna County, Pennsylvania
Universities and colleges in Wyoming County, Pennsylvania
1868 establishments in Pennsylvania
Private universities and colleges in Pennsylvania